= Minsk Radioengineering College =

Institution of higher education in Belarus

Coordinates: 53.9192°N 27.5928°E

- Минский радиотехнический колледж
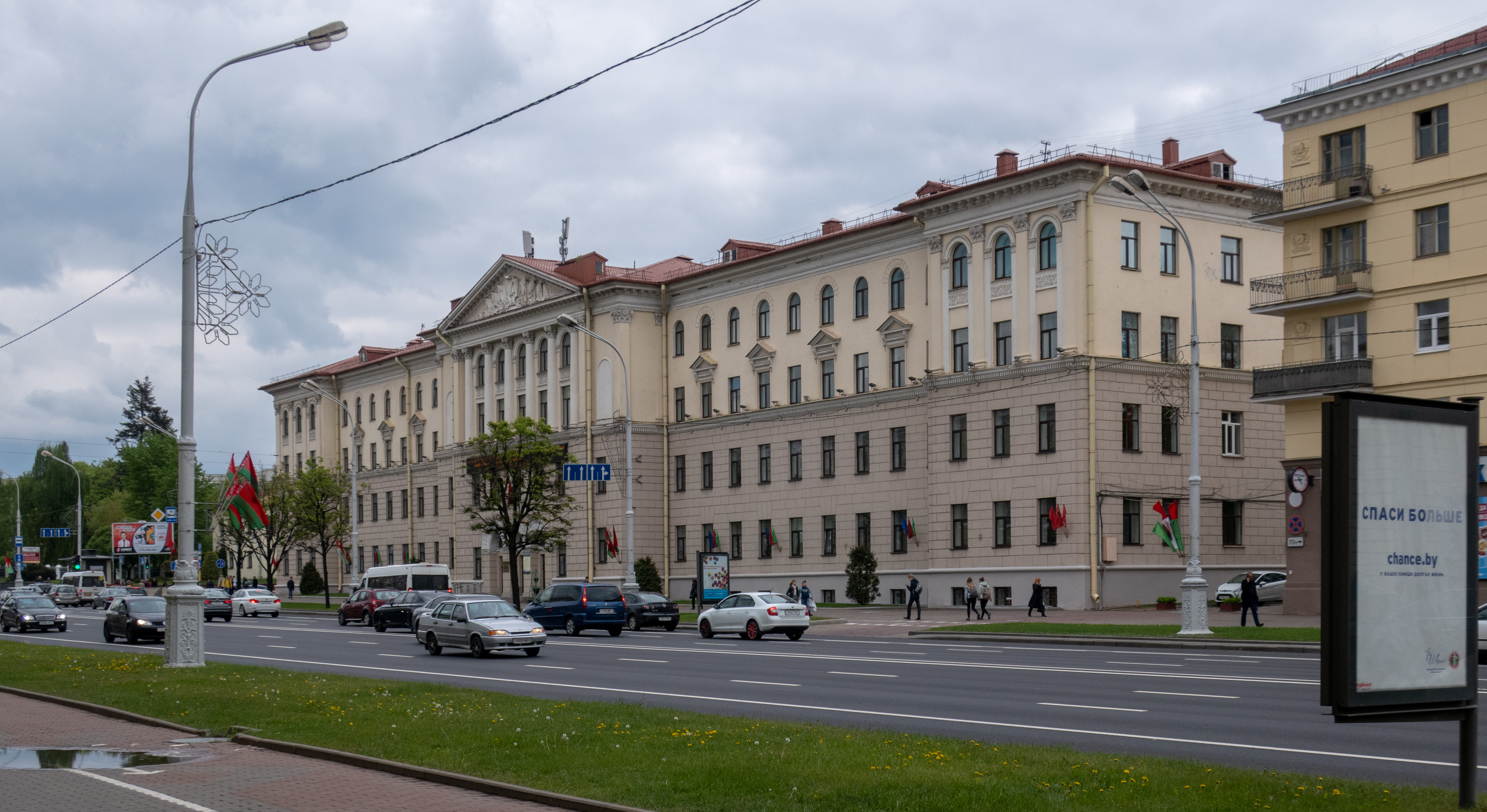
- Former names: Minsk Radioegnineering Technical School; Minsk State Higher Radioengineering College
- Type: Radioengineering
- Director: Victoria Shatalova
- Students: 1662
- Location: 220005, Minsk, Nezavisimosti ave., 62., Minsk, 220005, Belarus
- Language: Russian, Belarusian
- Website: mrk-bsuir.by

Minsk Radioengineering College (Belarusian: Мі́нскі Радыётэхні́чны Кале́дж, Mínski Radyjotechníčny Kaliédž, Russian: Минский Радиотехнический колледж, Minskiy Radiotekhnicheskiy kolledzh) is an educational Institution of the Republic of Belarus. Training with secondary special education on the basis of basic education.

== History ==
On July 2, 1960 on the basis of the BSSR Council of Ministers Resolution No. 383 "Minsk Radio Engineering College" was established. Having started its activities in the period of formation and development of the electronic industry in the Republic of Belarus, Radio Technical College is gradually transformed into a top college.

On 1 September 1960 200 students started their studies in the newly opened Minsk Radio Technical School, the establishment of which was determined by the development of industrial production, which identified the need of the republic in skilled technical personnel. The first set of students was carried out in the field:

- Electronic computers, instruments and devices
- Radioapparatostroenie
- Manufacture of electronic components and materials
- Programming for High-speed mathematical machines

22 teachers are trained professionals for full-time and correspondence courses. Among them were veterans of the Great Patriotic War, including – Hero of the Soviet Union Ivan Eliseevich Sambuc.

In 1991, there was an order of the Ministry of Public Education of the Republic of Belarus No.144 from 17 June. "On the transformation of an experiment in Minsk Radio Technical School in the school of a new type, the college".

In 1995, the college was again reorganized and gained new status and name "The Minsk State Higher Radio Technical College".

On November 1, 2015 Minsk State Higher Radio Technical College transformed into UO BSUIR branch "Minsk Radioengineering College".
